Big Brother 5, also known as Big Brother: Zero Privacy, was the fifth season of the Belgian version of Big Brother aired in the Flemish Region of Belgium on KanaalTwee.

After a three-year break, Big Brother 5 started on 26 February 2006 and finished on 29 May 2006 with a total duration of 92 days. The live shows were broadcast on Monday. A new house was built, it was completely made of glass from inside. 15 housemates participated this season. There was controversies around a housemate who was pregnant and a housemate who was diagnosed with HIV+. Concepts were "Zero privacy" and secrets. Kirsten Janssens was the winner and won €100,000.

The season was well received. Although the concept was "Zero privacy" and there were glass showers, there was less nudity this season. Director of KanaalTwee Nico Nulens called this a conscious choice because Big Brother was more than voyeurism. The revival season had more viewers than the previous season, having 355,000 ratings for the highlights and 420,000 ratings for the live shows. 607,237 viewers watched the final.
because of the success of this season, a new season was announced at the final night.

Format
This season launched as the revival of Big Brother Belgium after a three-year hiatus. It went back to the Back to Basics format and the nomination system as the first season. The slogan of the season was "Zero privacy". Since the previous house was demolished, a new house was built. All inner walls were made of glass, even the showers were in the middle of the bathroom and had only glass walls. It enlarged the concept "no privacy".

The central concept of the season was secrets. This season was filled with all kind of secrets: 
 The start of the season featured a secret loft and secret housemates.
 Most housemates had a personal secret who were unveiled during the season.
 Big Brother gave secret tasks or missions to one or more housemates.

Another novelty was the concept of Big Boss. The housemates voted one of the housemates as the Big Boss at the start of the new week. The Big Boss had some personal benefits:
 Big Boss could live for the entire week in the more luxurious loft with a housemate of own choice.
 Big Boss was the first to be informed of the nominations. Big Boss could change one of those nominated housemates to another housemate (including themself).
 Big Boss did the group shopping.

Housemates

  In a relationship before Big Brother.

Weekly summary

Nominations table

Notes

References

External links
 World of Big Brother

05
2006 television seasons